Bret Harte is a census-designated place (CDP) in Stanislaus County, California, United States. The population was 5,152 at the 2010 census, down from 5,161 at the 2000 census. It is part of the Modesto Metropolitan Statistical Area. It is named for the American poet and short story writer, Bret Harte, best known for his writings about the California Gold Rush.

Geography
Bret Harte is located at  (37.603182, -121.005844).

Demographics

2010
At the 2010 census Bret Harte had a population of 5,152. The racial makeup of Bret Harte was 2,441 (47.4%) White, 52 (1.0%) African American, 50 (1.0%) Native American, 40 (0.8%) Asian, 45 (0.9%) Pacific Islander, 2,327 (45.2%) from other races, and 197 (3.8%) from two or more races. Hispanic or Latino of any race were 4,272 persons (82.9%).

The whole population lived in households, no one lived in non-institutionalized group quarters and no one was institutionalized.

There were 1,185 households, 761 (64.2%) had children under the age of 18 living in them, 649 (54.8%) were opposite-sex married couples living together, 230 (19.4%) had a female householder with no husband present, 141 (11.9%) had a male householder with no wife present.  There were 130 (11.0%) unmarried opposite-sex partnerships, and 6 (0.5%) same-sex married couples or partnerships. 94 households (7.9%) were one person and 36 (3.0%) had someone living alone who was 65 or older. The average household size was 4.35.  There were 1,020 families (86.1% of households); the average family size was 4.41.

The age distribution was 1,851 people (35.9%) under the age of 18, 688 people (13.4%) aged 18 to 24, 1,457 people (28.3%) aged 25 to 44, 870 people (16.9%) aged 45 to 64, and 286 people (5.6%) who were 65 or older.  The median age was 25.5 years. For every 100 females, there were 109.4 males.  For every 100 females age 18 and over, there were 106.8 males.

There were 1,293 housing units at an average density of 2,356.3 per square mile, of the occupied units 555 (46.8%) were owner-occupied and 630 (53.2%) were rented. The homeowner vacancy rate was 1.9%; the rental vacancy rate was 6.9%.  2,389 people (46.4% of the population) lived in owner-occupied housing units and 2,763 people (53.6%) lived in rental housing units.

2000
At the 2000 census there were 5,161 people, 1,174 households, and 1,013 families in the CDP. The racial makeup of the CDP was 40.34% White, 1.14% African American, 1.92% Native American, 0.62% Asian, 0.02% Pacific Islander, 50.71% from other races, and 5.25% from two or more races. Hispanic or Latino of any race were 76.07%.

Of the 1,174 households 54.9% had children under the age of 18 living with them, 59.5% were married couples living together, 17.8% had a female householder with no husband present, and 13.7% were non-families. 9.7% of households were one person and 5.4% were one person aged 65 or older.  The average household size was 4.40 and the average family size was 4.59.

The age distribution was 38.3% under the age of 18, 13.1% from 18 to 24, 28.3% from 25 to 44, 14.1% from 45 to 64, and 6.2% 65 or older.  The median age was 24 years. For every 100 females, there were 104.0 males.  For every 100 females age 18 and over, there were 112.3 males.

The median household income was $26,568 and the median family income  was $27,155. Males had a median income of $27,591 versus $17,885 for females. The per capita income for the CDP was $7,481.  About 30.0% of families and 38.1% of the population were below the poverty line, including 43.7% of those under age 18 and 18.8% of those age 65 or over.

Government

See also
Twain Harte, California, a CDP in Tuolumne County

References

Census-designated places in Stanislaus County, California
Census-designated places in California